Karel Paar (born 3 January 1945) is a former Czech cyclist. He competed in the men's tandem  at the 1964 Summer Olympics.

References

1945 births
Living people
Czech male cyclists
Olympic cyclists of Czechoslovakia
Cyclists at the 1964 Summer Olympics
Sportspeople from Brno